Diana Nneka Atuona is a Nigerian-British playwright from Peckham, London. She studied at South Bank University before winning a scholarship from Gray's Inn to study law.

Her first play Liberian Girl won the Alfred Fagon award (2013) and opened at the Royal Court Theatre in 2015 to widespread acclaim. Atuona was also nominated for the Evening Standard Award as Most Promising Playwright and the Writer's Guild award for Best New Play.

Her second play, Trouble in Butetown, premiered at London's Donmar Warehouse in February 2023. It follows a black American GI who finds himself in the multicultural surroundings of Butetown, Cardiff.

References

Nigerian dramatists and playwrights
British dramatists and playwrights
Living people
Year of birth missing (living people)